The second-generation iPhone SE (also known as the iPhone SE 2 or the iPhone SE 2020) is a smartphone designed, developed, and marketed by Apple Inc. It is part of the 13th generation of the iPhone, alongside the iPhone 11 and 11 Pro/Pro Max models. Apple announced the second-generation iPhone SE on April 15, 2020, coinciding with the discontinuation of the iPhone 8 and 8 Plus. The iPhone SE succeeded the smaller and lighter first-generation iPhone SE. Pre-orders began on April 17, 2020, and the phone was subsequently released on April 24, 2020.

Following the pattern made by the first-generation iPhone SE (which shares the dimensions and form factor of the iPhone 5S, with the internal hardware of the iPhone 6S), the second-generation model shares the dimensions and form factor of the iPhone 8, while sharing selected internal hardware components from the iPhone 11 lineup, including the A13 Bionic system-on-chip (as opposed to the A11 Bionic system-on-chip found in the iPhone 8 series), which allows the phone to utilise the single Wide angle lens Portrait Mode, as on the iPhone XR. It also features the next generation Smart HDR-2 photos, which are marketed as being better than Smart HDR photos on the iPhone XS and iPhone XR.

History 
A successor to the first-generation iPhone SE had been a source of rumor stemmed in 2017, the year after original was released. The name was also subject to speculation. Guesses included (most prevalently) iPhone SE 2, iPhone SE 2020, and iPhone 9 due to design similarities with the iPhone 8.

In March 2020, cases for the phone were reportedly being supplied to Best Buy, showing an iPhone with an iPhone 8-sized body and a single camera lens. Belkin screen protectors for the iPhone SE were also listed on the online Apple Store, cross-compatible with the base models of the iPhones 6, 6S, 7, and 8. However, references to the iPhone SE were quickly removed.

On April 15, 2020, the second-generation iPhone SE was announced in a press release note on Apple's website. It was marketed as "A powerful new smartphone in a popular design", and was released worldwide on April 24, 2020.

The second-generation iPhone SE was discontinued on March 8, 2022, following the announcement of its successor, the third-generation iPhone SE.

Specifications

Design 
The iPhone SE features an aluminum frame, paired with a glass front and back. It shares the same physical sizes and dimensions as the iPhone 8 and is externally identical, except for a centered Apple logo and the removal of the iPhone branding in the lower midsection. As a result, phone cases made to fit the iPhone 8 will also fit the iPhone SE.

The iPhone SE is available in three colors: Black, White, and a Product Red edition. Though the offered colors line up with those of the iPhone 8 (Silver, Space Gray, and Product Red respectively, with no equivalent to the Gold model), the iPhone SE uses a noticeably deeper shade of black, a brighter shade of white, and a lighter shade of Product Red. The black and white colors are reminiscent of those on the iPhone XR, while the Product Red looks very similar to that on the iPhone 11. Unlike all prior white and silver iPhones from the iPhone 4 to the iPhone 8, except for the iPhone 5C, the 2020 iPhone SE features black bezels around the display on all models, matching the color schemes of the iPhone 11 and iPhone XR.

Size 
However, it is still thirty percent larger than the first generation variant, whose screen diagonal measures . 

Dan Seifert from The Verge declared the second-generation SE a "nail in the coffin" for small phones. This was affirmed by CNET, who stated that "Apple's decision to not build a brand-new 4-inch screen phone is telling. It signals that the company will probably never bring back the tiny iPhone, no matter how badly people crave it."

Hardware 
The iPhone SE incorporates the Apple A13 Bionic (7 nm) architecture system on a chip (SoC), with an integrated M13 motion coprocessor and third-generation neural engine. It is available in three internal storage configurations: 64 GB, 128 GB, and 256 GB. The SE has the same IP67 rating for dust and water resistance as the iPhone 8. The phone lacks the ultra-wideband features enabled by the U1 chip found in the iPhone 11 and 11 Pro. Despite the phone's smaller size which may lead to increased thermal throttling, the SE's A13 SoC runs at the same peak CPU frequencies as the iPhone 11. Like the iPhone 7 and 8 that were previously available in the same form factor, but unlike the iPhone 6, 6S and first-generation iPhone SE, the second-generation iPhone SE does not feature a standard 3.5 mm stereo headphone jack.

Display 
The iPhone SE features the same HD Retina display found on the iPhone 8, using IPS technology with True Tone and wide color gamut (Display P3). The display has a resolution of 1334 × 750 pixels, like the previous  iPhones. The pixel density is 326 PPI, the same as on all iPhones with LCDs since the introduction of the Retina display on the iPhone 4, excluding the Plus models. The pressure-sensing 3D Touch feature found on the iPhone 8 has been replaced with Haptic Touch on the iPhone SE, which initially did not work for notifications, but was later fixed in iOS 14. It can play HDR10 and Dolby Vision content despite not having an HDR-ready display, done by down-converting the HDR content to fit the display while still having some enhancements to dynamic range, contrast, and wide color gamut compared to standard content.

Camera 
The iPhone SE has a rear 12 MP camera with a single lens, similar to the single lens camera system of the iPhone 8, capable of recording 4K video (at 24, 25, 30, or 60 fps), 1080p HD video (at 30, 25 or 60 fps), or 720p HD video (at 30 fps). The camera has an aperture of ƒ/1.8, autofocus, optical image stabilization, and a quad-LED True Tone flash. The phone can also take panoramas up to 63 MP, and shoot photos in burst mode. The front camera is 7 MP with an aperture of f/2.2 and autofocus, capable of shooting 1080p HD video at 30 fps. The camera interface adopts "QuickTake" from the 11 and 11 Pro, which allows the user to long-press the shutter button to take a video. The burst function can now be accessed by swiping the shutter button to the left.

The new image signal processor and neural engine of the SE support several camera functions not supported on the iPhone 8. Like the 11 and 11 Pro, the rear camera supports next-generation Smart HDR. The rear camera also supports extended dynamic range video up to 30 fps, stereo recording and cinematic video stabilization. Both the front and rear cameras of the iPhone SE support Portrait mode and Portrait Lighting. Like the 11 and 11 Pro, Portrait mode has depth control and an advanced bokeh effect (blurring effect of the out-of-focus background around the portrait). However, the usage of older sensor hardware results in some limitations—the iPhone SE does not support the Night Mode or Deep Fusion features of the iPhone 11 and 11 Pro. The SE's implementation of Portrait mode only natively supports images of humans, as the hardware does not produce depth maps through the use of focus pixels and instead relies on software-based machine learning.

Software 

The iPhone SE was originally supplied with iOS 13.4, supporting Apple Pay and Apple Card. iOS 13.4.1, an update fixing bugs related to Bluetooth and FaceTime, was released on April 23, 2020 (a day prior to the device's official release), making it a day-one software update. The iPhone SE supports iOS 15. The iPhone SE can currently be upgraded to iOS 16.3, the newest update available.

Controversy

Power adapter and EarPods 
Apple, citing an environmental initiative, removed the EarPods (except in France) and power adapter from all new iPhone boxes beginning in October 2020, including the iPhone SE (2nd generation). Apple claimed that removing these items will reduce e-waste and permit a smaller iPhone box, allowing more devices to be shipped simultaneously to decrease carbon footprint. However, Apple now includes a USB-C to Lightning cable, incompatible with the existing USB-A power adapters that Apple previously shipped with their devices. Upgraders can still use their existing iPhone power adapters and cables, but users wanting fast charging capabilities will have to purchase a USB-C power adapter separately.

See also 
List of iOS devices
History of iPhone
Comparison of smartphones
 Timeline of iPhone models

References

External links

  – official site

IOS

Mobile phones introduced in 2020
Mobile phones with 4K video recording